Hetaerina rudis is a species of damselfly in family Calopterygidae. It is found in Guatemala and Mexico. Its natural habitats are subtropical or tropical moist montane forests and rivers. It is threatened by habitat loss.

References

Calopterygidae
Odonata of North America
Insects described in 1901
Taxonomy articles created by Polbot